Saladillo is a town in Buenos Aires Province, Argentina. It is the administrative centre for Saladillo Partido.

Notable residents
Tamara Elisabet DeMarco - professional boxer

External links

 Saladillo news website ABC Saladillo

 Municipal website
 ABC SALADILLO Digital Newspaper

Populated places in Buenos Aires Province
Populated places established in 1863